The Whakarapa River is a river of the Northland Region of New Zealand's North Island. Despite its name, it is probably better described as a northern silty arm of the Hokianga Harbour, which it meets 15 kilometres northeast of the latter's mouth.

See also
List of rivers of New Zealand

References

Hokianga
Rivers of the Northland Region
Rivers of New Zealand